The National Monument of the Kasbah, more simply called the National Monument, is a memorial monument and a prominent symbol of several events in Tunisia. It is located in the center of the Kasbah Square in Tunis, facing the Town Hall.

The monument was designed and executed by the Tunisian sculptor Abdelfattah Boussetta In 1989.

It also appears as a background image on the Tunisian ID cards.

Gallery

References

External links 

مراسم تحية العلم الوطني في ساحة القصبة(Video), The national flag salute in the Kasbah Square Ceremony ( Tunisian president).

Monuments and memorials in Tunisia